Selmasongs: Music from the Motion Picture Soundtrack 'Dancer in the Dark' is the first soundtrack album by Icelandic musician Björk. It was released on September 18, 2000, by One Little Indian Records to promote and accompany the film Dancer in the Dark. In the film, Björk starred as Selma Ježková, a Czech immigrant who has moved to the United States. The album features classical arrangements, as well as melodies and beats composed of sounds from mundane objects, such as factory machines and trains.

Notably, some songs on the album have lyrics that are substantially different from their lyrics in the film, the most pronounced example being "Scatterheart". The album omits the vocals of actors David Morse, Cara Seymour and Vladica Kostic. Some lyrics were rewritten, perhaps to prevent spoiling crucial plot details, since the soundtrack was released in stores before the movie opened in theaters, or to make the record flow better as a stand-alone album. In particular, on the song "I've Seen It All", Thom Yorke performs the words sung by Peter Stormare in the film. In addition, the tracks "My Favourite Things" and the original "Next to Last Song" do not appear on the album at all, despite appearances in the film.

The track "I've Seen It All" was nominated for an Academy Award for Best Original Song, and was released as a promotional single in 2000. For the track, Björk made a "webeo" with director Floria Sigismondi that premiered on September 1, 2000, on MTV.com. It used a shorter version of the song that the singer recorded  specifically for the webeo.

Background

Björk was initially offered the opportunity to write and produce the score for the film Dancer in the Dark. When she read the script, though, "the idea of putting all of me into this other person and trying to imagine what her interior would sound like was really exciting and quite liberating". Eventually, director Lars von Trier persuaded her to play the starring role. "The angle I took on it was that it wasn’t really acting", said Björk. "Then when we started preparing for the acting I told [von Trier] from the top that I would have to feel it from instinct. And he said 'That suits me fine because I can't stand actresses and acting'". Filming of Dancer in the Dark began in early 1999. She plays Selma, a Czech immigrant and single mother working in a factory in rural America who is going blind. Björk, who was known primarily as a musician, had rarely acted before, and has described the process of making the film as so emotionally taxing that she would not appear in any film ever again. She had several disagreements with von Trier over the content of the film, and later called him sexist, accusing him of sexual harassment. Co-star Catherine Deneuve and others have described her performance as feeling rather than acting. Björk has said that it is a misunderstanding that she was put off acting by this film; rather, she never wanted to act but made an exception for von Trier.

According to David Toop in The Wire, Selmasongs bridges "the art of noise of the Futurists, the plastic fantastic musique concrète slapstick of Esquivel, Dean Elliot and Jack Fascinato, techno beats and Broadway musicals". Barney Hoskyns wrote that the album continues the blend of techno and soaring strings first explored on Homogenic (1997), describing the contents as "torch-song histrionics with skittering Warp backbeats." Björk created the music using found sounds she recorded with a DAT recorder on the set of the film, resulting in a musique concrète style. As Toop explained, "Since the Selma character is isolated by blindness, stoicism and physical imprisonment, Björk used location sound as a way of finding music in ambient noise, one of the only sensory environments accessible to her." Accordingly, "Cvalda" starts with industrial sounds which soon become "a clipping shuffle", while "I've Seen It All" is built around a rhythmic loop of train sounds – created by Mark Bell and Valgeir Sigurdsson – which was compared by Toop to the sound design of the film Stalker (1979).

Critical reception

At Metacritic, which assigns a normalised rating out of 100 to reviews from mainstream critics, the album received an average score of 76, based on 20 reviews, which indicates "generally favorable reviews". Heather Phares from AllMusic gave a positive review, commenting, "Selmasongs best tracks are poignant, inventive expressions of Björk's talent and Selma's daydreams and suffering. [...] Selmasongs paints a portrait of a woman losing her sight, but it maintains Björk's unique vision". While giving a "C−" grade, David Browne from Entertainment Weekly noted that "the melding of drum and bass rhythms and panoramic classical orchestrations is as sonically impressive as it was on 1997's Homogenic. But something here brings out the most precious and irritating aspects of Björk's elfin voice", but "yet Selmasongs is mostly show tunes on Ecstasy, and you keep praying for a police raid".

Accolades
The song "I've Seen It All" was nominated for an Academy Award for Best Original Song, at the performance of which Björk wore her famous swan dress.

Commercial reception
Selmasongs sold more than 48,000 copies in the United States in less than two weeks.

Track listing

Personnel
Credits adapted from the liner notes of Selmasongs.

 Mark Bell - producer , programming, writer 
 Björk – arrangement , celesta, performer , producer, vocal editing, writer
 Jake Davies - additional recording, Pro Tools technician
 Catherine Deneuve - performer 
 Matt Fields - additional & assistant recording
 Geoff Foster - orchestra recording
 Ben Georgiades - assistant orchestra recording
 Isobel Griffiths – contractor (orchestra)
 Siobhan Fallon Hogan - performer 
 Jan 'Stan' Kybert - Pro Tools technician
 mecompany - cover
 Vincent Mendoza – arrangement, orchestra conductor
 Siobhan Paine - coordinator (Olympic Sessions)
 Sjón - writer 
 Valgeir Sigurðsson – engineering, programming
 Guy Sigsworth – arrangement , celesta
 Spike Stent - mixing
 Ad Stoop - location sounds
 Per Streit - location sounds
 Damian Taylor - celesta processing technician
 Lars von Trier - writer 
 Paul 'Dub' Walton - additional recording
 Wayne Wilkins - mixing assistant
 Thom Yorke - performer

Charts

Weekly charts

Year-end charts

Certifications and sales

References

2000 soundtrack albums
Albums produced by Mark Bell (British musician)
Björk albums
Musical film soundtracks
One Little Independent Records soundtracks
Albums produced by Björk
Drama film soundtracks
Lars von Trier
Musique concrète albums
Techno albums